The 2nd European Athletics U23 Cup was held on July 30–31, 1994.  The participating teams were classified in two divisions, A and B.

Results were compiled from various sources.

Division A
The contest for division A took place in Ostrava, Czech Republic.

Team trophies

Men

Women

Results

Men

Women

 Russian Yelena Lysak originally won the women's triple jump with a clearance of 13.88 m. However, she failed the subsequent doping test and she was disqualified from the competition and banned for four years.

Division B
The competition for division B took place in Lillehammer, Norway.

Team scores

Men

Women

Results

Women

References

Results
Technical results of the competition. European Under-23 Cup / / Athletics: A Magazine. - 1994. - No. 9-10 . - P. 18 .
Coupe d'Europe des moins de 23 ans: Les Français se distinguent  // L'Athlétisme : France. — 1994. — Septembre (no 374). — P. 46.

External links
 Leichtathletik-Europacup U23 1994 Lillehammer/Norwegen (Video) (in German)

European Athletics U23 Cup
International athletics competitions hosted by the Czech Republic
International athletics competitions hosted by Norway
European Athletics U23 Cup
European Athletics U23 Cup
European Athletics U23 Championships
European Athletics U23 Cup
1994 in youth sport
Sport in Ostrava
Sport in Lillehammer